Paa Grant Soccer Academy is a Ghanaian association football club and academy based in Sekondi-Takoradi, Ghana. They are a competing in the GAFCOA.

History
The team was founded in 2009 in honour of George Alfred (Paa) Grant, by his grandson Kim Tyrone Grant, a former Black Stars member and England legionnaire. Paa Grant Soccer Academy is the reserve and youth team of F.C. Takoradi.

Paa Grant Soccer Academy Management

Paa Grant Soccer Academy Technical Staff

Paa Grant Soccer Academy U16 – 2011

Paa Grant Soccer Academy U14 – 2011

References

External links
 Paa Grant Soccer Academy – Official website
 F.C. Takoradi – Official website

Football clubs in Ghana
Association football clubs established in 2009
2009 establishments in Ghana
Sekondi-Takoradi